Events in the year 1921 in Belgium.

Incumbents
Monarch – Albert I
Prime Minister – Henry Carton de Wiart (to 16 December); Georges Theunis (from 16 December)

Events

 24 April – Municipal elections
 April – Third Solvay Conference held in Brussels
 June – Crown Prince Hirohito's official visit to Belgium.
 18 September – 10th Gordon Bennett Cup held in Brussels
 20 November – Legislative elections (first with limited female suffrage)
 27 November – Provincial elections

Publications
 Olympic Games Handbook: Containing official records of the seventh Olympiad (New York, American Sports Publishing co.)
 Émile Cammaerts, Belgium from the Roman Invasion to the Present Day (London, T. Fisher Unwin)

Art and architecture

Buildings
 Antwerp Diamond Exchange completed.

Births
 21 March – Arthur Grumiaux, violinist (died 1986)
 13 April – Joseph Moureau, fighter pilot (died 2020)
 7 September – René Derolez, philologist (died 2005)

Deaths
 12 November – Fernand Khnopff (born 1858), painter

References

 
1920s in Belgium
Belgium
Years of the 20th century in Belgium
Belgium